Alexander Vasilyevich Tarasov (born 21 July 1961) is a Russian former pair skater who represented the Soviet Union. With Yulia Bystrova, he is the 1984 Prague Skate champion, 1985 Winter Universiade silver medalist, and 1987 Grand Prix International de Paris silver medalist.

Personal life 
Alexander Tarasov was born on 21 July 1961 in Sverdlovsk (Yekaterinburg), Russian SFSR, Soviet Union, and is married to Yulia Bystrova. Their son, Filipp Tarasov, was born in January 1992 and competed in pairs for Azerbaijan.

Career 
In his early years, Tarasov was coached by Svetlana Bukreyeva at DSO Trud in Sverdlovsk.

In 1982–83, he began competing in partnership with Yulia Bystrova. The pair was coached by Julia Rennik and Ardo Rennik and represented DSO Burevestnik Sverdlovsk. They won the gold medal at the 1984 Prague Skate, silver at the 1985 Winter Universiade, bronze at the 1985 St. Ivel International, and silver at the 1987 Grand Prix International de Paris. They competed until the end of the 1987–88 season.

After retiring from competition, Tarasov became a coach at DYUSSH Lokomotiv in Yekaterinburg.

Competitive highlights 
With Bystrova

References 

1961 births
Soviet male pair skaters
Living people
Sportspeople from Yekaterinburg
Universiade medalists in figure skating
Russian figure skating coaches
Universiade silver medalists for the Soviet Union
Competitors at the 1985 Winter Universiade